Craugastor escoces is a species of frog in the family Craugastoridae. It is endemic to Costa Rica. After not having been seen after 1986—despite extensive directed surveys—it was declared extinct by the International Union for Conservation of Nature (IUCN) in 2004. However, the species was rediscovered on September 18, 2016, when two researchers from the University of Costa Rica found a female Craugastor escoces at the edge of the Juan Castro Blanco National Park in Alajuela Province.

Habitat

References

escoces
Endemic fauna of Costa Rica
Amphibians of Costa Rica
Amphibians described in 1975
Taxa named by Jay M. Savage
Taxonomy articles created by Polbot